Meqas, also rendered as Meqyas, may refer to:
 Meqas-e Jadid, East Azerbaijan Province
 Meqas-e Qadim, East Azerbaijan Province
 Meqas, Razavi Khorasan